Route 180 is a  collector highway in northern New Brunswick, Canada. The western terminus is Route 17 at Saint-Quentin and the eastern terminus is Route 134 (St. Peter Ave.) in Bathurst. In Saint-Quentin, the road is called rue Mgr-Martin Est, and in Bathurst, it is named Vanier Boulevard.

Communities along Route 180
 Saint-Quentin
 Five Fingers
 Rang-Seize
 Rang-Dix-Huit
 Simpson Field
 South Tetagouche
 Sainte-Anne
 Bathurst

See also
List of New Brunswick provincial highways

References

180
180
180
Transport in Bathurst, New Brunswick